Lucius Minucius Basilus (died 43 BC) was a military commander and politician of the late Roman Republic, a trusted associate of Julius Caesar, who later participated in Caesar's assassination.

It was to Basilus that Cicero wrote his first excited note after hearing of the assassination of Caesar. In the notes to Cicero's Selected Letters, Basilus is described:L. Minucius Basilus had been a prominent officer, probably a legatus under Caesar in Gaul, and apparently served also in the civil war. He was, however, mortally offended because Caesar would not give him a province after his praetorship in 45 BC, but only a sum of money in return for his services, and so joined the conspiracy against him. In 43 BC he was killed by some of his own slaves whom he had punished by mutilation. He should probably be distinguished from L. Minucius Basilus, who took the name (instead of M. Satrius) on his adoption by a rich uncle, [and] mentioned as assuming by force the position of patronus over certain towns in Italy.

Basilus, denied a provincial command despite being a praetor, was insulted that Caesar tried to placate him with money, causing him to join the conspiracy.

See also
Liberatores
Assassination of Julius Caesar

Notes

1st-century BC Romans
Ancient Roman generals
Ancient Roman murder victims
Correspondents of Cicero
Year of birth unknown
Basilus, Lucius
Assassins of Julius Caesar
43 BC deaths